The Halmahera naked-backed fruit bat (Dobsonia crenulata) is a common and widespread species of megabat in the family Pteropodidae. It is endemic to Indonesia. The bat's non-Moluccan populations are apparently an undescribed separate sub-species.

Description 
With its greenish-colored fur, Dobsonia crenulata is similar in appearance to the greenish naked-backed fruit bat, but is larger and has heavier dentition. Births probably take place in December.

Distribution and habitat
The bat is endemic to Indonesia and found on the northern Moluccas, Togian Islands, Sangihe Islands, Talaud Islands, Pelang, Sulawesi, Muno, Buton, Peleng, Kabaena, Mangole, Sanana, Halmahera, Siau, Sangihe, Karekelang and Hoga Island. It occurs up to 1,000 meters above sea level.

It is commonly found in gardens and disturbed forest. It is not dependent on water. It roosts in caves, trees, and rock crevices. This species lives in large colonies.

Conservation 
It is assessed as least-concern by the IUCN. The species is common and widespread throughout its range and seems to fac no major threats. However, hunting and limestone extraction in its habitat in southern Sulawesi may be localised threats.

References

Halmahera naked-backed fruit
Halmahera naked-backed fruit bat
Endemic fauna of Indonesia
Halmahera naked-backed fruit bat
Mammals of Sulawesi
Halmahera naked-backed fruit bat
Least concern biota of Asia
Mammals described in 1909
Halmahera naked-backed fruit bat